Keisy Nicol Silveira Davitte (born 28 July 1995) is a Uruguayan footballer who plays as a forward for Portuguese Campeonato Nacional Feminino club Valadares Gaia FC and the Uruguay women's national team.

Club career
Silveira has played for Colón and Nacional in Uruguay, for Tolima in Colombia and for Paio Pires and Valadares Gaia in Portugal.

International career
Silveira represented Uruguay at the 2012 FIFA U-17 Women's World Cup. She made her senior debut on 23 May 2019 in a 1–3 friendly away loss to Argentina.

References 

1995 births
Living people
Footballers from Montevideo
Uruguayan women's footballers
Women's association football forwards
Valadares Gaia F.C. (women) players
Uruguay women's international footballers
Uruguayan expatriate women's footballers
Uruguayan expatriate sportspeople in Colombia
Expatriate women's footballers in Colombia
Uruguayan expatriate sportspeople in Portugal
Expatriate women's footballers in Portugal